A shrike is a passerine bird of the family Laniidae.

Shrike may also refer to:

Birds
Other passerine birds known as shrikes:
Helmetshrike (Prionopidae), an African family closely related to the true shrikes
Bushshrike (Malaconotidae), another African family, also formerly considered true shrikes
Cuckooshrike (Campephagidae), a widespread Old-World family
Shrikebill (Clytorhynchus), an Australasian genus of monarch-flycatcher
Shriketit (Falcunculidae), birds in the genus Falcunculus
Shrike-tyrant (Agriornis), a South American genus of tyrant-flycatchers
Woodshrike (Vangidae), birds in the genus Tephrodornis
Australian magpie (Gymnorhina tibicen), the true piping shrike
Bornean bristlehead (Pityriasidae), also known as the bristled shrike or bald-headed wood-shrike
Magpie-lark (Grallina cyanoleuca), an Australian tyrant-flycatcher mistaken for the piping shrike

Military
 Curtiss Shrike (disambiguation), several American combat aircraft of the 1930s
 USS Shrike, two US Navy ships
 Bell X-9 Shrike, a prototype surface-to-air guided missile
 AGM-45 Shrike, an American anti-radiation missile designed to home in on hostile antiaircraft radars
 RNAS Maydown, also known as HMS Shrike, a former Royal Navy Naval Air Station
 Ares Shrike 5.56, a belt-fed machine gun conversion kit
 Focke-Wulf Fw 190 Würger (English: Shrike), a German World War II fighter aircraft
 The Mighty Shrikes, the nickname of United States Navy Strike Fighter Squadron 94

Entertainment

In fiction
 Shrike (comics), the codename of a series of DC comics characters
 The Shrike, a monster in the Hyperion Cantos science fiction book series
 The Shrike, a character in the 1973 novel Christie Malry's Own Double-Entry by English writer B. S. Johnson
 The Shrike, an enemy in the video game Brute Force
 Shrike, a character in Nathanael West's novella Miss Lonelyhearts
 Shrike, a character in the computer game Red Faction II
 Shrike, a character in the 2018 film Mortal Engines
 Shrike, the nickname of the monster Renfri in the short story The Lesser Evil by Andrzej Sapkowski, from his The Witcher series
 Lionel Shrike, a character in the films Now You See Me and Now You See Me 2
 The Shrike, a character in the Marvel Television series Agents of S.H.I.E.L.D.
 The Shrykes, a sapient, birdlike species in the Edge Chronicles book series
 The Minnesota Shrike, the nickname of the fictional serial killer Garret Jacob Hobbs in the Hannibal (TV series)
 Blood Shrike, the title of the Emperor's second in command in Sabaa Tahir's An Ember in the Ashes novel series
 Shrikes, the second generation light attack craft in the Honor Harrington science fiction series by David Weber
 An animal in the 1979 book series The Animals of Farthing Wood by Colin Dann, and the subsequently televised British-French animated series by the same name
 A heavily armed enemy vessel in the 3rd season of the Paramount+ television series Star Trek: Picard.

Other entertainment
 The Shrike (play), a 1952 Pulitzer Prize–winning drama by Joseph Kramm
 The Shrike (film), a 1955 film based on the play
 "Shrike", a song by Irish musician Hozier from the 2019 album  Wasteland, Baby!

Other uses
 Shrike (racing car), an Australian open-wheel racing car
 Shrike Commander, an Aero Commander aircraft